Koishikute (恋しくて / Yearn for You) is the fifty-fourth single by Japanese singer-songwriter Koda Kumi, released on December 26, 2012, pushed back from the original release date of December 5, 2012. The single debuted No. 4 on the Oricon Daily Charts, took No. 7 for the week and remained on the charted for six weeks. The single peaked at number 8 on the Billboard Japan Hot 100, her fifth highest charting single of the 2010s decade.

Information
Koishikute is Japanese R&B-turned-pop singer Koda Kumi's fifty-fourth single under the Avex sub-label Rhythm Zone. Initially, the song was to be released in early December, but was pushed back and released later that month. The single peaked at No. 4 on the Oricon Daily charts and took No. 7 for the weekly ranking. It remained on the charts for six consecutive weeks.

The coupling track "Alone" was a cover of the song originally sung by Mayo Okamoto in 1996, making it the first time Koda Kumi has had a single with both a ballad for the a-side and the b-side since her release of "hands" in 2005. Alone was later released on her second cover album Color the Cover.

"Koishikute" was certified gold for 100,000 downloads in January 2014.

Packaging
The single was released in three editions:

CD: contains two songs.
CD+DVD: contains two songs, music video and making video.
Playbutton+Goods: contains one song, shopping bag and a sports towel.

The playbutton+goods edition came with the single mp3 in a button, a shopping bag and a towel with Koda Kumi's official fan club logo.

Promotions
The single was promoted as being as intense and with a similar message to one of her more famous ballads, "Ai no Uta" (2007). On her official Facebook, the banner that was posted compared "Ai no Uta" to "Koishikute."

Track listing

Oricon sales chart (Japan)

Alternate versions
Koishikute
Koishikute: Found on the single (2012) and corresponding album Bon Voyage (2014)
Koishikute [ (RE:LABEL®) Remix]: Found on Koda Kumi Driving Hit's 5 (2013)

Alone
Alone: Found on the single (2012) and album Color the Cover (2013)
Alone [Prog5 Classic Remix]: Found on Koda Kumi Driving Hit's 5 (2013)

References

External links 
 Official Website

2012 singles
2012 songs
Japanese-language songs
Koda Kumi songs
Rhythm Zone singles
Songs written by Koda Kumi